The Surxondaryo or Surkhandarya (Surkhandarya) is a primary right tributary of the Amu Darya in Uzbekistan. It is formed at the confluence of the rivers Karatag and Toʻpolondaryo near the city Denov. It flows into the Amu Darya in the city Termez.

It gives its name to the Surxondaryo Region.

Flora and fauna
The natural habitat in area of the river Surxondaryo consists of tugai and reed forests, where the Caspian tiger occurred and abundant of deer and wild boar.

References

Rivers of Uzbekistan